Bretonne is the fourth studio album by French singer Nolwenn Leroy, with arrangements by Jon Kelly. The album was released December 6, 2010 and has a reissue with 7 additional tracks 28 November 2011. It is a homage to her native Brittany. This is an album dedicated to Breton and Celtic music which marked Nolwenn, mixing traditional songs, modern pop in connection with standards of Celtic music. It includes traditional Breton tunes, more recent songs and an original song signed by the Breton singer Miossec.

The album was a certified double diamond disc in France, a double platinum disc in Belgium and a gold disc in Switzerland. After its successful release in Germany it was released internationally in July 2012 (UK, Canada, Japan). Its release in the United States was accompanied by a concert in New York City, January 8, 2013.

Track listing

French edition
Original edition (2010):
 "Tri Martolod"
 "La Jument de Michao"
 "Suite Sudarmoricaine"
 "Greensleeves"
 "Brest"
 "Bro Gozh ma Zadoù"
 "Mná na hÉireann"
 "Ma Bretagne quand elle pleut"
 "Je ne serai jamais ta Parisienne"
 "Karantez Vro"
 "Le Bagad de Lann-Bihoué"
 "Dans les prisons de Nantes"
 "Rentrer en Bretagne"
 "Sunday Bloody Sunday" (iTunes exclusive)

Unreleased tracks from the Deluxe Edition (2011):
 "Moonlight Shadow"
 "Scarborough Fair"
 "Whiskey in the Jar"
 "Siúil A Rúin"
 "To France"
 "Amazing Grace"
 "Dirty Old Town"

US edition
Nolwenn (2013):
 "Moonlight Shadow"
 "Scarborough Fair"
 "Dirty Old Town"
 "Amazing Grace"
 "Tri Martolod"
 "Whiskey in the Jar"
 "Siúil A Rúin"
 "Greensleeves"
 "Suite Sudarmoricaine"
 "To France"
 "Mná na h-Éireann"
 "Karantez Vro"

Singles
 Suite Sudarmoricaine
 Mná na h-Éireann
 La Jument de Michao
 Tri Martolod
 Brest
 Moonlight Shadow

Charts

Weekly charts

Year-end charts

References

2010 albums
Nolwenn Leroy albums
Albums produced by Jon Kelly
French-language albums
Universal Music France albums
Mercury Records albums
Celtic albums by French artists
World music albums by French artists